Elinor Ruth Tatum is the Publisher and Editor in Chief of the New York Amsterdam News, the oldest and largest black newspaper in the City of New York, and one of the oldest ethnic papers in the country.

Background 
Elinor Tatum was appointed to her position by her father Wilbert Tatum in 1997, and became one of the youngest publishers in the history of the Afro-American press. As editor and publisher Ms. Tatum oversees a staff of 25 full-time employees.  Under her watch, the newspaper was modernized, and changes have included: a new layout for the paper, and refocusing content to emphasize more current issues facing Harlem and the wider African-American community in New York and the Nation. Under her leadership, The Amsterdam News has also gone online and is seen nationally as part of the Black Press USA Network.

Elinor Tatum also produces and co-hosts a weekly segment of Al Sharpton’s radio show Keepin' It Real — inviting members of the Black Press to discuss national issues facing the African-American community.  She has guest hosted the WWRL Radio morning and afternoon drive programs. Tatum has appeared on The O'Reilly Factor, 20/20, New York 1, CUNY TV, The Today Show, and NBC Nightly News.

Tatum born and raised in New York City. Where she attended Hunter College Elementary School and then the Dwight School. She studied Government at St. Lawrence University in Canton, New York, graduating in 1993. She continued her education at Stockholm University in Stockholm, Sweden.  While abroad, she studied International relations and the Swedish model of government.

In 1994, Tatum returned to New York to join her father at the New York Amsterdam News. She accepted a position as Assistant to the Publisher, her work included reporting for the paper. While reporting, she filed stories on topics ranging from the Million Man March, to Boxing, to a student strike at the City University of New York.

In 1996, Tatum was promoted to Associate Publisher and Chief Operating Officer of the newspaper.  That fall, she entered New York University working toward her Master’s Degree in Journalism and Mass Communication, while continuing to work full-time at the Amsterdam News. In December 1997, she completed the course work for her Master’s Degree and was promoted to Publisher and Editor-in-Chief.

Ms. Tatum is Jewish. Her mother was a Holocaust survivor who was born in Czechoslovakia in 1934. In 1939, her mother, along with her parents and four brothers, escaped to South America, settling in Ecuador. Her mother's sister survived Auschwitz. Another aunt was a nurse in the Terezin concentration camp and also survived. Ms. Tatum has been visiting Israel since childhood and is active in efforts to promote understanding between the Black and Jewish communities.

In addition to her career in journalism, Tatum is also an active member of the greater New York community. She is currently, a member of the Board of Trustees of her college alma mater, St. Lawrence University.  In addition she sits on the Board of the New York Urban League, The Neighborhood Defender Service of Harlem, and the Creative Vision Foundation. She also sits on Manhattan Community Board 3.

Tatum has been received numerous honors for her work including: inclusion in Who’s Who of American Women'' (the Millennium Edition and subsequent editions), a Doctor Of Humane Letters Honoris Causae from Metropolitan College (New York City), Manhattan Borough Presidents’ Women’s History Month Award, Public Advocates Award, Women Who Make A Difference, Outstanding Business Empowerment Award from the New York Chapter of Black Business and Professional Women, Standing On their Shoulders Award from the National Action Network, and the Good Scout Award.

Personal 
Tatum has one daughter, Willa Tatum Simmons.

References 

African-American publishers (people)
American publishers (people)
Businesspeople from New York City
Living people
Year of birth missing (living people)
21st-century African-American people
New York Amsterdam News people